Blind Football is variation of futsal designed for players who are blind or visually impaired.  It is currently a Paralympic sport, and the International Blind Sports Association (IBSA) also organizes a World Championship.

History
According to IBSA, "Football for the blind and partially sighted started out as a playground game for school children in special schools for the visually impaired."

46 Countries in Men's ranking in 2022.

Rules
Generally speaking, the rules of blind football are very similar to the rules of futsal.  There are, however, some important exceptions:

All players, except for the goalkeeper, are blindfolded.
The ball has been modified to make a jingling or rattling sound.
Players are required to say "voy", "go", or something similar when going for the ball; this alerts the other players about their position.
A guide, positioned outside the field of play, provides instructions to the players.

Results

Men's

B1

Source: IBSA Football - Results

B2/B3 (Partially Sighted)

Source: IBSA Football - Results

Women's

Source: IBSA Football - Results

IBSA Blind Football European Championships 

Source:

1997:https://blindfootball.sport/wp-content/uploads/2021/02/IBSA-Blind-Football-European-Championships-Barcelona-1997.pdf
1999:https://blindfootball.sport/wp-content/uploads/2021/02/IBSA-Blind-Football-European-Championships-Porto-1999-results.pdf
2001:
2003:https://blindfootball.sport/wp-content/uploads/2021/02/IBSA-Blind-Football-European-Championships-Manchester-2003-results-.pdf
2005:https://blindfootball.sport/wp-content/uploads/2021/02/IBSA-Blind-Football-European-Championships-2005-results.pdf
2007:https://blindfootball.sport/wp-content/uploads/2021/02/IBSA-Blind-Football-European-Championships-2007-results.pdf
2009:https://blindfootball.sport/wp-content/uploads/2021/02/IBSA-Blind-Football-European-Championships-2009-Nantes-results.pdf
2011:https://blindfootball.sport/wp-content/uploads/2021/02/IBSA-Blind-Football-European-Championships-Turkey-2011-results.pdf
2013:https://blindfootball.sport/wp-content/uploads/2021/02/IBSA-Blind-Football-European-Championships-2013-results-and-final-standings.pdf
2015:https://blindfootball.sport/wp-content/uploads/2021/02/IBSA-Blind-Football-European-Championships-Hereford-2015-results.pdf
2017:https://blindfootball.sport/wp-content/uploads/2021/02/IBSA-Blind-Football-European-Championships-Berlin-2017-results.pdf
2019:https://blindfootball.sport/wp-content/uploads/2021/02/IBSA-Blind-Football-European-Championships-Rome-2019-results-and-final-standings.pdf
2022:https://blindfootball.sport/wp-content/uploads/2022/06/2022-Men%C2%B4s-Euros-Final-Report.pdf

Mens B1

Division A

Division B
2017:https://blindfootball.sport/wp-content/uploads/2021/02/2017-IBSA-Blind-Football-Division-2-European-Championships.pdf
2019:https://blindfootball.sport/wp-content/uploads/2021/02/IBSA-Blind-Football-European-Championships-Division-2-Bucharest-March-2019.pdf
2021:https://blindfootball.sport/wp-content/uploads/2021/10/2021-IBSA-Blind-Football-European-Championships-Division-2-results-and-final-standings.pdf

Womens B1
2022: https://blindfootball.sport/wp-content/uploads/2022/06/2022-IBSA-Women%C2%B4s-Euros-Final-Standings.pdf

Mens B2/B3
1997:https://blindfootball.sport/wp-content/uploads/2021/02/IBSA-Partially-Sighted-Football-European-Championships-Barcelona-1997.pdf
1999:https://blindfootball.sport/wp-content/uploads/2021/02/IBSA-Partially-Sighted-Football-European-Championships-Belarus-1999-results.pdf
2009:https://blindfootball.sport/wp-content/uploads/2021/02/IBSA-Blind-Football-European-Championships-2009-Nantes-results.pdf
2012:https://blindfootball.sport/wp-content/uploads/2021/02/IBSA-Partially-Sighted-Football-European-Football-Championships-2012-results.pdf
2014:https://blindfootball.sport/wp-content/uploads/2021/02/IBSA-Partially-Sighted-Football-European-Championships-2014-Italy-results.pdf
2016:https://blindfootball.sport/wp-content/uploads/2021/02/IBSA-Partially-Sighted-Football-European-Championships-2016-results.pdf
2018:https://blindfootball.sport/wp-content/uploads/2021/02/IBSA-Partially-Sighted-Football-European-Championships-Tbilisi-2018-results.pdf

1 Spain 2 Italy 3 Belarus 4 Great Britain 5 Ireland

1 Spain 2 Belarus 3 Great Britain 4 Italy 5 France 6 Russia 7 Greece

BLR UKR ESP FRA IRL ENG ITA TUR

BLR ESP UKR ENG RUS ITA TUR

ESP RUS UKR ENG ITA TUR AUT
 
UKR FRA GBR TUR ESP

UKR RUS ENG ITA TUR GEO

Euro Challenge Cup
2014:https://blindfootball.sport/wp-content/uploads/2021/02/IBSA-Euro-Challenge-Cup-2014-results-and-final-standings.pdf
2016:https://blindfootball.sport/wp-content/uploads/2021/02/IBSA-Euro-Challenge-Cup-2016-Results-and-final-standings-.pdf
2018:https://blindfootball.sport/wp-content/uploads/2021/02/IBSA-Blind-Football-Euro-Challenge-Cup-2018-results-and-final-standings.pdf
2022:https://blindfootball.sport/wp-content/uploads/2022/07/4th-IBSA-Blind-Football-Euro-Challenge-Cup-Stockholm-2022-Final-Report.pdf

See also
 World Blind Football Championships
 Paralympic Games
 Paralympic soccer
 Football 5-a-side at the Asian Para Games
 IBSA Blind Football Asian Championships

References

External links
International Blind Sports Federation (IBSA)
 https://blindfootball.sport/results-and-rankings/world-rankings/

Blind sports